Pavel Aleksandrovich Brullov, also Briullov or Bryullov (29 August 1840, Saint Petersburg - 16 December 1914, Saint Petersburg) was a Russian landscape painter and professor of architecture.

Biography
His father, Alexander Brullov, was a Professor of Architecture at the Imperial Academy of Arts and his uncle was the painter Karl Bryullov. He originally studied physics and mathematics at Saint Petersburg State University, becoming a Candidate in 1863. At the same time (from 1861 to 1864) he took classes in architecture at the Academy, where he studied under Konstantin Thon, Andrei Stackenschneider, David Grimm and his father. In 1864, he graduated with the rank of "Artist Third-Degree".

Following this, he went abroad, visiting Italy, France and England. In Paris, he attended the classes of Léon Bonnat at the École des Beaux-arts. In 1870, his painting "После работы" (After Work) was awarded a medal at the Imperial Academy. From 1872 until his death, he was a member of the "Association of Travelling Art Exhibitions" (Peredvizhniki), serving as their treasurer and governing board member. In 1883, he became a full member of the Academy, serving on the board after 1904. From 1897 to 1912, he was Curator of the art department at the Russian Museum.

Selected paintings

References

External links 

 Pavel Brullov @ Russian Painting

1840 births
1914 deaths
Landscape painters
19th-century painters from the Russian Empire
Russian male painters
20th-century Russian painters
Full Members of the Imperial Academy of Arts
Peredvizhniki
19th-century male artists from the Russian Empire
20th-century Russian male artists